Walter Michael "Mike" Dickson (23 November 1884 – 26 September 1915) was a rugby union player, who represented Scotland, Blackheath and Oxford. He was killed in World War I.

Early life

Dickson was born in Rondebosch, Cape Colony (present-day South Africa), the younger son of Caroline Dickson.

He attended Diocesan College, SA, and University College, Oxford with a Rhodes Scholarship. At Oxford, he played in the Varsity XV of 1912 alongside Stephen Steyn, Billy Geen, Edward Fenwick Boyd, Gerard Crole and Eric Loudoun-Shand.

Rugby career
Dickson played four games for the Barbarians, against Cardiff on 26 December 1911, Newport, the following day, Penarth on 5 April 1912 and Cheltenham on 9 April. He scored four points in the match against Cheltenham.

Dickson was first selected to play for Scotland in the Five Nations Championship match against France on 20 January 1912. The previous year, France had beaten Scotland 16–15 at Colombes. On this occasion, Scotland exacted a 'cruel revenge', winning the game 31–3 at Inverleith.

Dickson was playing for London Scottish in 1912 when he was selected to play against the touring South Africans.

Dickson was selected to play in the first game of 1913 on 1 January against France at the Parc des Princes. The French press wondered if the 16–15 victory of two years previous at Colombes would be repeated. 30,000 spectators turned out to watch the game. The French forwards were stronger in the scrum but Scotland's back line proved much faster and outperformed the French both in attack and defence. France scored the first try but Scotland quickly took the lead with a converted try, and a second, unconverted try consolidated the lead to 3–8 at half time. The French were unable to score again and the final result was 3–21 to the Scots. The match referee, Baxter, was impressed by the French pack but thought the French centres were responsible for the defeat, too slow to catch their opponents.

Dickson was selected to play against Wales in 1913 but it was rumoured before the game that he would withdraw.

International appearances

Military service
Dickson returned to South Africa after university and worked as a surveyor. When the war broke out, he returned to the UK from Durban on the SS Norman arriving in London on 4 November 1914. He enlisted in the Argyll and Sutherland Highlanders, and was commissioned second lieutenant (temporary) on 22 January 1915. He arrived in France in July 1915 and was killed in action at Loos on 26 September 1915.

He is remembered on the Loos Memorial (Panel 125–127), Pas de Calais, France.
Eric Loudoun-Shand, his teammate at Oxford, said of Dickson, "He was one of the kindest and best fellows imaginable."

See also
 List of international rugby union players killed in action during the First World War

References

Bibliography

External links
 "An entire team wiped out by the Great War".  The Scotsman, 6 November 2009

1884 births
1915 deaths
Alumni of Rondebosch Boys' High School
Argyll and Sutherland Highlanders officers
British Army personnel of World War I
British military personnel killed in World War I
People from Rondebosch
Rugby union players from Cape Town
Scotland international rugby union players
Scottish rugby union players
South African rugby union players
Rugby union fullbacks
Barbarian F.C. players
Blackheath F.C. players